Antoni Jaszczak (3 June 1946 – 21 July 2008) was a Polish economist and a member of the Sejm, the lower house of the Polish parliament. From 5 May 2006 to 3 November 2006 he served as Minister of Construction of the Republic of Poland in the following cabinets of Prime Ministers Kazimierz Marcinkiewicz and Jarosław Kaczyński.

References

1946 births
2008 deaths
People from Żary
Polish economists
Members of the Polish Sejm 2001–2005
Members of the Polish Sejm 2005–2007
Government ministers of Poland